Redwood Highway is a 2013 American independent drama film directed by Gary Lundgren, produced by James Twyman, and written by Lundgren and Twyman. The film stars Shirley Knight and Tom Skerritt.

Plot
Living in a comfortable retirement community in southern Oregon, estranged from her family, unsatisfied with her surroundings, and generally not happy about life, Marie (Shirley Knight) decides to journey 80 miles on foot to the coast of Oregon to see the ocean for the first time in 45 years and attend her granddaughter's wedding as an unexpected guest. Along the way, she meets an extraordinary cast of characters and discovers that you're never too old to learn something about life and about yourself.

Cast
 Shirley Knight as Marie Vaughn
 Tom Skerritt as Pete
 James LeGros as Michael Vaughn
 Zena Grey as Naomi Vaughn
 Michelle Lombardo as Stacia
 Sam Daly as Buck
 Brent Hinkley as Mel

Production
Redwood Highway was filmed in numerous locations throughout southern Oregon, including Ashland, Talent, Phoenix, Grants Pass, Cave Junction, and Brookings. The filmmakers and most of the crew members involved are from southern Oregon.

Release
In October 2013, Monterey Media bought the United States distribution rights and will release the film in the United States and Canada. The film will be released in theaters in the United States and Canada in April 2014.

Festivals
Redwood Highway was selected to screen at the following film festivals:
2013 Ashland Independent Film Festival
2013 Mt Rainier Film Festival
2013  Northwest Film Forum Local Sightings Film Festival
2013  Tacoma Film Festival
2014 Sedona International Film Festival

References

External links

2013 films
American independent films
2010s English-language films
Films shot in Oregon
2013 independent films
2010s American films